Salinas de Chaca or Salinas de Jaca is a locality located in the municipality of Las Peñas de Riglos, in Huesca province, Aragon, Spain. As of 2020, it has a population of 23.

Geography 
Salinas de Chaca is located 53km northwest of Huesca.

References

Populated places in the Province of Huesca